Methodist Episcopal Church, also known as Omar-Fisher's Landing United Methodist Church, is a historic United Methodist church located at Orleans in Jefferson County, New York. It was built in 1892 and is a modest -story, wood-frame vernacular Gothic Revival structure.  It features an open square belfry with Gothic detailing.

It was listed on the National Register of Historic Places in 1996.

References

Churches on the National Register of Historic Places in New York (state)
Methodist churches in New York (state)
Gothic Revival church buildings in New York (state)
Churches completed in 1892
19th-century Methodist church buildings in the United States
Churches in Jefferson County, New York
National Register of Historic Places in Jefferson County, New York
Methodist Episcopal churches in the United States